Related is an American comedy-drama television series that aired on The WB from October 5, 2005, to March 20, 2006. It revolves around the lives of four close-knit sisters of Italian descent, raised in Brooklyn and living in Manhattan.

The show was created by former Sex and the City writer Liz Tuccillo, and executive produced by Friends co-creator Marta Kauffman. Despite heavy promotion, initial ratings did not warrant the show being picked up for a second season when The WB network was folded into The CW.

Cast and characters

Main
 Jennifer Esposito as Ginnie, the oldest of the Sorelli sisters. She is an ambitious 30-year-old corporate attorney and the only sister who is married. In the premiere episode, Ginnie learned that she was pregnant, but she subsequently lost the baby.
 Kiele Sanchez as Ann, the second-oldest sister. She is a 26-year-old therapist who specializes in counseling transvestites.
 Lizzy Caplan as Marjee, who is 23 years old. At the beginning of the series, she was working as a party planner and dating her boss's boyfriend, Jason. Later, Marjee quit her job and started a business with Jason.
 Laura Breckenridge as Rose, the youngest of the Sorelli sisters. She is a 19-year-old college student attending NYU. Originally she was a pre-med major, but later changed her major to drama, despite her father's wishes.
 Callum Blue as Bob Spencer, Ginnie's British husband who works as a software engineer in the music industry. He recently worked on Jack Johnson's tour.

Recurring
 Tom Irwin as Joe Sorelli, the father of the Sorelli sisters, a widower who owns and lives above a deli named Sorelli's Deli in Brooklyn.
 Christine Ebersole as Renée, Joe Sorelli's new wife.
 Dan Futterman as Danny, Ann's ex-boyfriend and the owner of a restaurant called Sabroso. Ann had been going with Danny for six years when he moved out of their apartment and dumped her. Ann suspected Danny of having an affair with Megan. Later, Danny got back together with Ann, but then broke up with her once again after learning that she had had an abortion shortly after they started seeing each other, but kept it from him for six years.
 Victor Webster as Marco, who grew up with Ann and works at Sorelli's Deli where he makes sausages. Ann slept with him after breaking up with Danny.
 Andrew Keegan as Zach, a college student who lives in the same dorm as Rose at NYU. Ann slept with him after breaking up with Danny.
 Anne Elizabeth Ramsay as Trish Houghton, who was Marjee's boss and was dating Jason Greenstein until he began dating Marjee. Trish is obsessed with her dog and hates both Marjee and Jason for what they have done to her.
 Julian Ovenden as Jason Greenstein, who worked for Trish and dated her, while also seeing Marjee. He later left Trish and started a business with Marjee.
 Kyle Howard as Joel, a student at NYU and has been Rose's best friend for a long time. He is also in love with her. He dates a woman named Chloe, but Chloe dumps him because she knows that he and Rose have feelings for each other.
 Chris Carmack as Alex Brody, Rose's new boyfriend. He is a classmate of Rose's in experimental theater and directed a play in which he and Rose starred. However, Alex dumped Rose at Joe's wedding so he could go to Hollywood to become an actor.

Other characters
 Judith Ivey as Bob's mother, who has a knack for hurting Ginnie's feelings although much of it may be unintentional. Bob's parents live in England. They visit Bob and Ginnie for Christmas, 2005.
 Roger Rees as Robert Spencer, Bob's father who apparently likes to drink.
 Jamie Ray Newman as Kylie Stewart, a singer who is Bob's ex-girlfriend and for whom Bob produces an album.
 Shanola Hampton as Flash (real name: Tiffani Lusinski), Rose's punky roommate. She and Rose are not good friends.
 Megan Linder as Megan, the hostess at Danny's restaurant.
 Peter Paige as Patrick, the son Renee gave up for adoption 19 years ago and has not seen since. He owns a bed and breakfast on Cape Cod.
 Dana Delany as Francesca Sorelli, Joe Sorelli's wife and the mother of the Sorelli sisters. She died 15 years earlier of cancer.

Guest
 Victor Webster as Marco
 Jillian Barberie as herself
 The Veronicas (Jess and Lisa Origliasso) as themselves
 Joanna Canton as Chloe, Joel's girlfriend
 Nick D'Agosto as PJ, Marjee's friend
 Zachary Knighton as Gary, Joel's roommate
 Paolo Seganti as Nino Rosati, Marjee's piano teacher
 Frederick Weller as Ginnie's colleague who handles the sale of Sorelli's Deli for the buyer
 Dennis Boutsikaris as Professor Kasnov
 John Prosky as Dr. Gorenberg
 Jackie Geary as Justine, Ann's friend
 Armelia McQueen as the lady at the NYU housing office
 Jonathan Silverman as Brad, Ann's horrible wedding date
 Francesca Catalano as Ginnie at age 17
 Courtney Hope as a young Ann
 Alyssa Shafer as a young Rose
 Laura San Giacomo as Ann Sorelli
 Jon Hamm as Danny
 Kyle Howard as Joel, Rose's friend

Episodes

External links
 
 WPIX New York Related

2000s American comedy-drama television series
2005 American television series debuts
2006 American television series endings
English-language television shows
Television series about sisters
Television series by Warner Bros. Television Studios
Television shows filmed in California
Television shows set in New York City
The WB original programming